Basketball events were contested at the 1991 Summer Universiade in Sheffield, England.

References
 Universiade basketball medalists on HickokSports

Universaiie
1991 Summer Universiade
1991
Universiade